Carboxypeptidase A5 is an enzyme that in humans is encoded by the CPA5 gene.

Carboxypeptidases have functions ranging from digestion of food to selective biosynthesis of neuroendocrine peptides. Members of the A/B subfamily of carboxypeptidases, such as CPA5, contain an approximately 90-amino acid pro region that assists in the folding of the active carboxypeptidase domain. Cleavage of the pro region activates the enzyme (Wei et al., 2002).[supplied by OMIM]

References

External links

Further reading